Senegal is a country in West Africa. Senegal is bordered by Mauritania in the north, Mali to the east, Guinea to the southeast, and Guinea-Bissau to the southwest. Senegal also borders The Gambia, a country occupying a narrow sliver of land along the banks of the Gambia river, which separates Senegal's southern region of Casamance from the rest of the country. Senegal also shares a maritime border with Cape Verde. Senegal's economical and political capital is Dakar. It is the westernmost country in the mainland of the Old World, or Afro-Eurasia, and owes its name to the Senegal River, which borders it to the east and north.

The main industries include food processing, mining, cement, artificial fertilizer, chemicals, textiles, refining imported petroleum, and tourism. Exports include fish, chemicals, cotton, fabrics, groundnuts, and calcium phosphate. The principal foreign market is India at 26.7 percent of exports (as of 1998). Other foreign markets include the United States, Italy and the United Kingdom.

Notable firms 
This list includes notable companies with primary headquarters located in the country. The industry and sector follow the Industry Classification Benchmark taxonomy. Organizations which have ceased operations are included and noted as defunct.

See also

References

Senegal